"Gimme Some More" is a song by Busta Rhymes from the album E.L.E. (Extinction Level Event): The Final World Front. 

Gimme Some More may also refer to:

"Gimme Some More" (The J.B.'s song), a song by the J.B.'s from the album Food for Thought
"Gimme Some More", a 1969 song by Crazy Elephant
"Gimme Some More", a song by Labi Siffre from the album Crying Laughing Loving Lying

See also
 "Gimme More"